I. triloba  may refer to:
 Ipomoea triloba, the littlebell or Aiea morning glory, a flowering plant species native to the tropical Americas
 Isias triloba, a synonym for Serapias neglecta, an orchid species endemic to southern Europe

See also